Sediminimonas is a Gram-negative, non-spore-forming and non-motile genus of bacteria from the family of Rhodobacteraceae with one known species (Sediminimonas qiaohouensis). Sediminimonas qiaohouensis has been isolated from sediments from a salt mine in Yunnan in China.

References

Rhodobacteraceae
Bacteria genera
Monotypic bacteria genera